

Taylor Airport  is a public use airport located one nautical mile (2 km) north of the central business district of Albany, a city in Shackelford County, Texas, United States.

Facilities 

See also 

References

External links 

 Aerial image as of February 1995 and topographic map from USGS The National Map
 Aeronautical chart at SkyVector

Defunct airports in Texas
Airports in Texas
Transportation in Shackelford County, Texas